Reeta Devi (born 26 November 1975) is an Indian politician, who currently serves as Member of Legislative Assembly from Indora Assembly constituency. Reeta Devi won from Indora constituency in 2017 state assembly elections.

Early life and education
Devi was born on 26 November 1975 in Bhugnara, Kangra, Himachal Pradesh to Dulo Ram and Krishna Devi.
She did her school education up to Secondary education. Then she did an ITI diploma in Cutting and Embroidery from ITI Dharmshala.

Politics
Devi's active state politics started from 2010 as she became the Zila Parishad from 2010-15.
Then in 2017, she was elected to the thirteenth Himachal Pradesh Legislative Assembly in December, 2017.

References
 

Bharatiya Janata Party politicians from Himachal Pradesh
1975 births
Living people
Himachal Pradesh MLAs 2017–2022